The Egyptian Athletic Federation is the governing body for the sport of athletics in Egypt. It is a member of the Confederation of African Athletics and World Athletics. 

The Federation was founded in 1910 and currently based at the Sport Federations Building, Nasr City, Cairo.

References

External links
Official website

Egypt
Athletics in Egypt
Athletics
National governing bodies for athletics
Sports organizations established in 1910